"Walk like a Panther" is a song by the All Seeing I with vocals from Tony Christie. It charted at number 10 on the UK Singles Chart.

Background
"Walk like a Panther" was performed by All Seeing I with main vocals from Tony Christie and background vocals from Steve Edwards, and was written by Richard Barratt, Jason Buckle, Jarvis Cocker and Dean Honer, and was their third single from their album Pickled Eggs and Sherbet. It was written specifically for Christie to such an extent that it even mentions one of his past hits – "I Did What I Did for Maria" – and describes the hometown of the band members of the All Seeing I, Cocker and Christie: Sheffield. Cocker personally contacted Christie, who was living in Spain at the time as this was where he was most successful, asking if he would feature on the record.

Music video
A music video was produced for the song. it was shot in Castle Market, Sheffield, it features Christie singing his parts and culminates in others walking with their arms held high in time with the music, mimicking panthers.

Chart performance
Walk like a Panther peaked in January 1999 at number 10 on the UK Singles Chart, becoming Christie's first hit in that country for twenty five years. It would be the band's only top ten single; The Beat Goes On and 1st Man in Space would peak at numbers 11 and 28 respectively.

Critical reception
NME said of the song "People just don't write songs like this any more!", said the song had "the vocal gravitas of a man, a common man, defiant in his invective against his lot, his shitty neighbourhood" and ended by describing it as "brave, impassioned and chuffin' catchy."

Usage in popular culture
The band performed the song on Top of the Pops, and the song was featured on the album Top of the Pops 1999, Vol. 1. It was also featured on the compilation albums The Chillout Album, Vol. 2, Soundsystem Four and Now 42. Three years later, The Pretenders covered the song on their album Loose Screw.

The title of the song was the inspiration for the 2018 British comedy Walk Like a Panther. Rick Astley covered the song as part of the film's soundtrack.

References

Songs about cats
1999 songs
Songs written by Jarvis Cocker
The All Seeing I songs
Tony Christie songs
FFRR Records singles